Carrollton Ridge is a neighborhood of South Baltimore, Maryland, United States

The area currently known as Carrollton Ridge is a low income residential neighborhood directly west of Baltimore's Inner Harbor. Its boundaries are roughly defined by Frederick Avenue to the north, Carroll Park to the south, Bentalou Street to the west and Fulton Avenue to the east.  The neighborhood is racially diverse, though predominantly African American. The homes in Carrollton Ridge are mostly rowhouses.

Carrollton Ridge derived its name from two things. First, Dr. Charles Carroll, and his estate (a  remnant of which currently exists as Carroll Park). Second, the geographic ridge which runs alongside the western edge of the neighborhood.

Carrollton Ridge is home to Ohio Ave., which at approximately 25 feet long has exactly one residential address, making it the world's shortest residential street according to the Guinness Book of World Records.

References

External links
Carrollton Ridge Community Association
neighborhood map

Neighborhoods in Baltimore
Carroll family residences
South Baltimore